Sunei Jaidee (born 22 May 1976) is a Thai former footballer who played as a midfielder. He played for Thailand at the 1996 Asian Cup.

External links

Sunei Jaidee
Living people
1976 births
Place of birth missing (living people)
Association football midfielders
Sunei Jaidee
Sunei Jaidee